The High Mobility Multipurpose Wheeled Vehicle (HMMWV; colloquial: Humvee) is a family of light, four-wheel drive, military trucks and utility vehicles produced by AM General. It has largely supplanted the roles previously performed by the original jeep, and others such as the Vietnam War-era M151 jeep, the M561 "Gama Goat", their M718A1 and M792 ambulance versions, the Commercial Utility Cargo Vehicle, and other light trucks.  Primarily used by the United States military, it is also used by numerous other countries and organizations and even in civilian adaptations. The Humvee saw widespread use in the Gulf War of 1991, where it navigated the treacherous desert terrain; this usage helped to inspire civilian Hummer versions. The vehicle's original unarmored design was later seen to be inadequate. The vehicle was found to be particularly vulnerable to improvised explosive devices in the Iraq War. The U.S. hastily up-armored select models and replaced front-line units with the MRAP. The U.S. military sought to replace the vehicle in front-line service under the Joint Light Tactical Vehicle (JLTV) program. In 2015 the Oshkosh L-ATV was selected for production.

History

Since the World War II Willys MB reconnaissance truck was used for mass-deployment and became known as the "jeep", the United States military had continued to rely heavily on jeeps as general utility vehicles and as a mass-transport for soldiers in small groups. Although the U.S. Army had let Ford redesign the jeep from the ground up during the 1950s, and the resulting M151 jeep incorporated significant innovations, it firmly adhered to the original concept: a very compact, light enough to manhandle, low profile vehicle, with a folding windshield, that a layman could barely distinguish from the preceding Willys jeeps. The jeeps were shorter than a Volkswagen Beetle and weighed just over one metric ton, seating three to four, with an  payload. During and after the war, the very light, -ton jeeps were complemented by the -ton Dodge WC and Korean War Dodge M37 models.

By the mid-1960s, the U.S. military felt a need to reevaluate their aging light vehicle fleet. For starters, from the mid-1960s, the U.S. Army had tried to modernize, through replacing the larger, purpose-built Dodge M37s by militarized, "commercial off the shelf" (COTS) 4×4 trucks — initially the M715 Jeep trucks, succeeded in the later 1970s by several "CUCV" adapted commercial pickup series, but these did not satisfy newer requirements either. What was wanted was a truly versatile light military truck, that could replace multiple outdated vehicles. When becoming aware of the U.S. Army's desire for a versatile new light weapons carrier/reconnaissance vehicle, as early as 1969 FMC Corporation started development on their XR311 prototype and offered it for testing in 1970. At least a dozen of these were built for testing under the High Mobility Combat Vehicle, or HMCV program, initially much more as an enhanced capability successor to the M151 jeep, than as a general-purpose vehicle. In 1977, Lamborghini developed the Cheetah model in an attempt to meet the Army contract specifications.

In 1979, the U.S. Army drafted final specifications for a High Mobility Multipurpose Wheeled Vehicle (HMMWV), which was to replace all the tactical vehicles in the 1/4-ton to 5/4-ton range, namely the M151 quarter-ton jeeps, M561 Gama Goats, and the CUCVs, as one uniform "jack-of-all-trades" light tactical vehicle series, to better perform the roles of the impractically mixed fleet of outdated existing vehicles. The specification called for excellent on and off-road performance, the ability to carry a large payload, and improved survivability against indirect fire. Compared to the jeep, it was larger and had a much wider track, with a  ground clearance, double that of most sport-utility vehicles. The new truck was to climb a 60 percent incline and traverse a 40 percent slope. The air intake was to be mounted flush on top of the right fender (or to be raised on a stovepipe to roof level to ford)  of water and electronics waterproofed to drive through  of water were specified. The radiator was to be mounted high, sloping over the engine on a forward-hinged hood.

Out of 61 companies that showed interest, only three submitted prototypes. In July 1979, AM General, a subsidiary of American Motors Corporation, began preliminary design work. Less than a year later, the prototype was in testing. Chrysler Defense and Teledyne Continental also produced competing designs. In June 1981, the Army awarded AM General a contract for the development of several more prototype vehicles to be delivered to the government for another series of tests.

The three companies were chosen to design and build eleven HMMWV prototypes; the vehicles were subjected to over 600,000 miles in trials which included off-road courses in desert and arctic conditions.  AM General was awarded an initial contract in 1983 for 2,334 vehicles, the first batch of a five-year contract that would see 55,000 vehicles delivered to the U.S. military, including 39,000 vehicles for the Army; 72,000 vehicles had been delivered to the U.S. and foreign customers by the Persian Gulf War of 1991, and 100,000 had been delivered by the Humvee's 10th anniversary in 1995. Ft. Lewis, Washington, and the 2nd Battalion, 47th Infantry, 9th Infantry Division was the testing unit to employ HMMWV in the new concept of a motorized division. Yakima Training Center in Yakima, Washington, was the main testing grounds for HMMWVs from 1985 through December 1991, when the motorized concept was abandoned and the division inactivated.

Use in combat
HMMWVs first saw combat in Operation Just Cause, the U.S. invasion of Panama in 1989. The HMMWV was designed primarily for personnel and light cargo transport behind front lines, not as a front line fighting vehicle. Like the previous jeep, the basic HMMWV has no armor or protection against chemical, biological, radiological, or nuclear threats. Nevertheless, losses were relatively low in conventional operations, such as the Gulf War. Vehicles and crews suffered considerable damage and losses during the Battle of Mogadishu in 1993 because of the nature of urban engagement. However, the chassis survivability allowed the majority of those crews to return to safety, though the HMMWV was never designed to offer protection against intense small arms fire, much less machine guns and rocket-propelled grenades. With the rise of asymmetric warfare and low-intensity conflicts, the HMMWV was pressed into service in urban combat roles for which it was not originally intended.

After Operation Restore Hope in Somalia, the military recognized a need for a more protected HMMWV and AM General developed the M1114, an armored HMMWV to withstand small arms fire. The M1114 has been in production since 1996, seeing limited use in the Balkans before deployment to the Middle East. This design is superior to the M998 with a larger, more powerful turbocharged engine, air conditioning, and a strengthened suspension system. More importantly, it boasts a fully armored passenger area protected by hardened steel and bullet-resistant glass. With the increase in direct attacks and asymmetric warfare in Iraq, AM General diverted the majority of its manufacturing power to producing these vehicles.

Humvees were sent into Afghanistan following the 9/11 terrorist attacks, where they proved invaluable during initial operations. In the early years before IEDs became prevalent, the vehicle was liked by troops for its ability to access rough, mountainous terrain. Some soldiers would remove features from Humvees, including what little armor it had and sometimes even entire doors, to make them lighter and more maneuverable for off-road conditions and to increase visibility. With the onset of the Iraq War, Humvees proved very vulnerable to IEDs; in the first four months of 2006, 67 U.S. troops died in Humvees. To increase protection, the U.S. military hastily added armor kits to the vehicles. Although this somewhat improved survivability, bolting on armor made the Humvee an "ungainly beast", increasing weight and putting a strain on the chassis, which led to unreliability. Armored doors that weighed hundreds of pounds were difficult for troops to open, and the newly armored turret made Humvees top-heavy and increased the danger of rollovers. The U.S. Marine Corps decided to start replacing Humvees in combat with Mine-Resistant, Ambush-Protected (MRAP) vehicles in 2007, and the U.S. Army stated that the vehicle was "no longer feasible for combat" in 2012. However, Humvees have also been used by Taliban insurgents for suicide bombings against the Afghan National Security Forces in the country.

The HMMWV has become the vehicular backbone of U.S. forces around the world. Over 10,000 HMMWVs were employed by coalition forces during the Iraq War. The Humvee has been described as a vehicle with "the right capability for its era": designed to provide payload mobility in protected (safe) areas. However, deploying the vehicle to conflict zones where it was exposed to a full spectrum of threat which it was neither designed to operate, or be survivable in, led to adding protection at the cost of mobility and payload.

On 22 April 2022, Pentagon Press Secretary John F. Kirby described a package of military equipment being transported to Ukraine to assist in its war with Russia, including "100 armored Humvee vehicles". An additional 50 were promised on 19 August 2022.

Modifications

In December 2004, Secretary of Defense Donald Rumsfeld came under criticism from U.S. troops and their families for not providing better-equipped HMMWVs. Rumsfeld pointed out that, before the war, armor kits were produced only in small numbers per year. As the role of American forces in Iraq changed from fighting the Iraqi Army to suppressing the insurgency, more armor kits were being manufactured, though perhaps not as fast as production facilities were capable. Even more advanced kits were also being developed. Unlike similar-sized civilian cargo and tow trucks, which typically have dual rear wheels to reduce sway, the HMMWV has single rear wheels because of its independent rear suspension coupled with the body design.

Most up-armored HMMWVs hold up well against lateral attacks when the blast is distributed in all different directions but offer little protection from a mine blast below the truck, such as buried IEDs and land mines. Explosively formed penetrators (EFPs) can also defeat the armor kits, causing casualties.

The armor kits fielded include the Armor Survivability Kit (ASK), FRAG 5, FRAG 6, as well as upgrade kits to the M1151. Armor Holdings fielded an even lighter kit, adding only  to the vehicle's weight. The Marine Armor Kit (MAK), fielded in January 2005, offers more protection than the M1114 but also increases weight. The FRAG 5 offered even more protection but was still inadequate to stop EFP attacks. The doors may also require a mechanical assist device to open and close.

Another drawback of the up-armored HMMWVs occurs during an accident or attack, when the heavily armored doors tend to jam shut, trapping the troops inside. As a result, the U.S. Army Aviation and Missile Research, Development, and Engineering Center developed the Humvee Crew Extraction D-ring in 2006. The D-ring hooks on the door of the HMMWV so that another vehicle can rip the door off with a tow strap, chain, or cable to free the troops inside. The D-ring was later recognized as one of the top 10 greatest Army inventions of 2006. In addition, Vehicle Emergency Escape (VEE) windows, developed by BAE Systems, were fielded for use on the M1114 up-armored HMMWV, with 1,000 kits ordered.

The soldier manning the exposed crew-served weapon on top of the vehicle is extremely vulnerable. In response, many HMMWVs have been fitted with basic gun shields or turrets, as was the case with M113 APCs after they were first deployed in Vietnam. The U.S. military is currently evaluating a new form of protection, developed by BAE Systems as well as systems designed by the Army, which are already in theater. Additionally, some HMMWVs have been fitted with a remotely operated CROWS weapon station, which slaves the machine gun to controls in the back seat so it can be fired without exposing the crew. The Boomerang anti-sniper system was also fielded by some HMMWVs in Iraq to immediately give troops the location of insurgents firing on them.

Another weakness for the HMMWV has proven to be its size, which limited its deployment in Afghanistan because it is too wide for the smallest roads and too large for many forms of air transport compared to jeeps or Land Rover-sized vehicles (which are, respectively, 24 and 15 inches narrower). This size also limits the ability of the vehicle to be manhandled out of situations.

Alternatives
The Army purchased a purpose-built armored car, the M1117 Armored Security Vehicle also known as an armored personnel carrying vehicle (APC), in limited numbers for use by the United States Army Military Police Corps. In 2007, the Marine Corps announced an intention to replace all HMMWVs in Iraq with MRAPs because of high loss rates and issued contracts for the purchase of several thousand of these vehicles, which include the International MaxxPro, the BAE OMC RG-31, the BAE RG-33 and Caiman, and the Force Protection Cougar, which were deployed primarily for mine clearing duties. Heavier models of infantry mobility vehicles (IMV) can also be used for patrol vehicles. The MaxxPro Line has been shown to have the highest rate of vehicle rollover accidents because of its very high center of gravity and immense weight.

Replacement and future

The Humvee replacement process undertaken by the U.S. military focused on interim replacement with MRAPs and long-term replacement with the Joint Light Tactical Vehicle (JLTV). The HMMWV has evolved several times since its introduction and was used in tactical roles for which it was never originally intended. The military pursued several initiatives to replace it, both in the short and long terms. The short-term replacement efforts utilized commercial off-the-shelf vehicles as part of the Mine Resistant Ambush Protected (MRAP) program. These vehicles were procured to replace Humvees in combat theaters. The long-term replacement for the Humvee is the JLTV which is designed from the ground up.  The Future Tactical Truck System (FTTS) program was initiated to analyze potential requirements for a Humvee replacement. Various prototype vehicles such as the MillenWorks Light Utility Vehicle, and the ULTRA AP have been constructed as part of these efforts. The JLTV contract was awarded to Oshkosh in August 2015.

The U.S. Marine Corps issued a request for proposals in 2013 for its Humvee sustainment modification initiative to upgrade 6,700 expanded capacity vehicles (ECVs). The Marines plan to field the JLTV but do not have enough funding to completely replace all Humvees, so they decided to continue sustaining their fleet. Key areas of improvement include upgrades to the suspension to reduce the amount of force transferred to the chassis, upgrading the engine and transmission for better fuel efficiency, enhancements to the cooling system to prevent overheating, a central tire inflation system to improve off-road mobility and ride quality, and increased underbody survivability. Testing of upgraded Humvees was to occur in 2014, with production and installation occurring from 2015 through 2018. Older A2 series Humvees make up half the current fleet, and 4,000 are to be disposed of through foreign military sales and transfers. By 2017, the Marines' light tactical vehicle fleet is to consist of 3,500 A2 series Humvees, 9,500 ECV Humvees, and 5,000 JLTVs, with 18,000 vehicles in total. Humvees in service with the Marine Corps will be upgraded through 2030. The Marines shelved the Humvee modernization effort in March 2015 because of budget cuts.

Several companies are offering modifications to maintain the remaining U.S. military Humvee fleets. Oshkosh Corporation is offering Humvee upgrades to the Marine Corps in addition to its JLTV offering, which are modular and scalable to provide varying levels of capabilities at a range of prices that can be provided individually or as complete packages. Their approach is centered around the TAK-4 independent suspension system, which delivers greater off-road profile capability, improved ride quality, an increase in maximum speed, greater whole-vehicle durability, and restored payload capacity and ground clearance. Northrop Grumman developed a new chassis and power train for the Humvee that would combine the mobility and payload capabilities of original vehicle variants while maintaining the protection levels of up-armored versions.  The cost to upgrade one Humvee with Northrop Grumman's features is $145,000. Textron has offered another Humvee upgrade option called the Survivable Combat Tactical Vehicle (SCTV) that restores mobility and survivability over armored Humvee levels.  Although the SCTV costs more at $200,000 per vehicle, the company claims it can restore the Humvee for operational use, combining Humvee-level mobility and transportability with MRAP-level underbody protection as a transitional solution until the JLTV is introduced in significant numbers.

One suggested future role for the Humvee is as an autonomous unmanned ground vehicle (UGV).  If converted to a UGV, the vehicle could serve as a mobile scout vehicle with armor features removed to enhance mobility and terrain accessibility, since there would be no occupants needed to protect.  Because there will still be tens of thousands of Humvees in the U.S. inventory after the JLTV enters service, it could be a low-cost way to build an unmanned combat vehicle fleet.  Autonomy features would allow the Humvees to drive themselves and one soldier to control a "swarm" of several vehicles.

Although the Army plans to buy 49,100 JLTVs and the Marine Corps 5,500, they are not a one-for-one replacement for the Humvee, and both services will still be left operating large fleets.  For the Marines, 69 JLTVs will replace the 74 Humvees in all active infantry battalions to cover its expeditionary forces. The Marine JLTV order is planned to be completed by 2022, leaving the remainder of the Corps' 13,000-strong Humvee force scattered around support organizations while soft-skinned Humvees will provide support behind the forward-deployed Marine Expeditionary Unit. The Army does not plan to replace Humvees in the Army National Guard and is considering options on how many of its 120,000 vehicles will be replaced, sustained, or modernized. Even if half of the force is replaced by JLTVs, the entire planned order will not be complete until 2040. If upgrades are chosen for the remaining Humvees, the cost would likely have to not exceed $100,000 per vehicle. The Humvee is expected to remain in U.S. military service until at least 2050. Ambulance variants of the Humvee will especially remain in active use, as the JLTV could not be modified to serve as one due to weight issues.

Design features

The Humvee seats four people with an available fully enclosed metal cabin with a vertical windshield. The body is constructed from lightweight and rust-resistant aluminum, instead of conventional steel. It has all-wheel drive with an independent suspension and helical gear-reduction hubs similar to portal axles which attach towards the top rather than the center of each wheel to allow the drivetrain shafts to be raised for a full  of ground clearance. The body is mounted on a narrow steel frame with boxed rails and five cross members for rigidity. The rails act as sliders to protect the drivetrain which is nestled between and above the rails. Raising the drivetrain into the cabin area and lowering the seats into the frame creates a substantial chest-high transmission hump which separates passengers on each side and lowers the overall center of gravity compared to most trucks where the body and passengers are above the frame.

The vehicle also has double-wishbone suspension with portal gear hubs on all 4 wheels; and all-around inboard disc brakes. The brake discs are not mounted at the wheels, as on conventional cars, but are inboard of the half-shafts, attached right outside of the differentials. The front and rear differentials are Torsen type, and the center differential is a regular, lockable type. Torque-biasing differentials allows forward movement as long as at least one wheel has traction. It runs on specialized 37 × 12.5 radial tires with low-profile runflat devices. Newer HMMWV versions can be equipped with an optional central tire inflation system (CTIS) kit in the field.

HMMWVs are well suited for airmobile operations as they are transportable by C-130 or larger combat transports, droppable by parachute, and can be sling-loaded from helicopters, though there are smaller vehicles such as the Growler which were designed to fit into smaller craft such as the V-22. In combat conditions, the HMMWV can be delivered by the Low Altitude Parachute Extraction System which pulls the vehicle out of the open rear ramp just above the ground without the aircraft having to land.

There are at least 17 variants of the HMMWV in service with the U.S. military. HMMWVs serve as cargo/troop carriers, automatic weapons platforms, ambulances (four litter patients or eight ambulatory patients), M220 TOW missile carriers, M119 howitzer prime movers, M1097 Avenger Pedestal Mounted Stinger platforms, MRQ-12 direct air support vehicles, S250 shelter carriers, and other roles. The HMMWV is capable of fording 2.5 ft (76 cm) normally, or 5 ft (1.5 m) with the deep-water fording kits installed.

Optional equipment includes a winch (maximum load capacity  and supplemental armor. The M1025/M1026 and M1043/M1044 armament carriers provide mounting and firing capabilities for the M134 Minigun, the Mk 19 grenade launcher, the M2 heavy machine gun, the GAU-19A/B gatling gun, the M240G/B machine gun and M249 LMG.

The M1114 "up-armored" HMMWV, introduced in 1996, also features a similar weapons mount. In addition, some M1114 and M1116 up-armored and M1117 Armored Security Vehicle models feature a Common Remotely Operated Weapon Station (CROWS), which allows the gunner to operate from inside the vehicle, and/or the Boomerang anti-sniper detection system. Recent improvements have also led to the development of the M1151 model, which quickly rendered the previous models obsolete. By replacing the M1114, M1116, and earlier armored HMMWV types with a single model, the U.S. Army hopes to lower maintenance costs.

The latest iteration of the Humvee series can be seen in the M1151A1 and later up-armored A1-versions. The armor protection can be installed or taken off depending on the operating environment, so the vehicles can move more efficiently without armor when there is no threat of attack. There is some underbody armor that moderately protects against mines and roadside bombs. Other improvements include Vehicle Emergency Escape (VEE) windows that can be quickly removed so troops inside can escape in the event of a rollover, jammed door, or the vehicle catching fire, and a blast chimney that vents the force of a bomb blast upwards and away from the occupants. The M1151A1 has a crew of four, can carry  of payload, and can tow a  load.

Variants

Major HMMWV A0/A1/A2 versions
With the introduction of the A1 series the number of models was reduced, with further designation revisions when the A2 series was introduced.

M56/M56A1 Coyote Smoke Generator Carrier (mounted on an HMMWV; not a Type Classified HMMWV)
M707 Knight (replaced, originally mounted on an M1025A2 HMMWV; not a Type Classified HMMWV)
M966/M966A1 TOW Missile Carrier, basic armor, without a winch
M996 Mini-ambulance, two-litter, hardtop (type classified but not produced)
M997/M977A1/M977A2 Maxi-ambulance, four-litter, basic armor
M998/M998A1 Cargo/Troop Carrier without a winch
M998 HMMWV Avenger (mounted on an HMMWV; not a Type Classified HMMWV)
M1025/M1025A1 Armament Carrier, basic armor, without a winch
M1025A2 Armament/TOW Missile Carrier, basic armor
M1026/M1026A1 Armament Carrier, basic armor, with winch
M1035/M1035A1/M1035A2 Soft top Ambulance, two-litter
M1036 TOW Missile Carrier, basic armor, with winch
M1037 Shelter Carrier, without a winch
M1037 Shelter Carrier MSE
M1038/M1038A1 Cargo/troop Carrier with winch
M1042 Shelter Carrier, with winch
M1043/M1043A1 Armament Carrier, supplemental armor, without a winch
M1043A2 Armament Carrier, supplemental armor
M1044/M1044A1 Armament Carrier, supplemental armor, with winch
M1045/M1045A1 TOW Missile Carrier, supplemental armor, without a winch
M1045A2 TOW Missile Carrier, supplemental armor
M1046/M1046A1 TOW Missile Carrier, supplemental armor, with winch
M1069 Tractor for M119 105-mm Gun
M1097/M1097A1 Heavy Hummer Variant (HHV) 
M1097A2 base platform
M1097A2 Cargo/Troop Carrier/Prime Mover (replacing the M998A1)
M1097A2 Shelter Carrier
M1097 Heavy HMMWV Avenger (mounted on an HMMWV; not a Type Classified HMMWV)
 Packhorse – Attachment to convert an M1097 to tractor version for semi-trailers
XM1109 Up-Armored Heavy Hummer Variant (UA-HHV) (replaced by M1114)
M1123 Troop/cargo (U.S. Marines specific M1097A2)

Active Denial System (mounted on an HMMWV)
Ground Mobility Vehicle (GMV) — USSOCOM Special Ops variants — initially based on the M1025; later GMV models based on the M1113 chassis. Another model, based on the M1165 HMMWV can be fitted with armor kits to create an 'up-armored' GMV with additional armor plating and an optional ballistic shield around the top gunner's turret.
Variants are: GMV-S (Army Special Forces), GMV-R (75th Ranger Regiment), GMV-N (Navy SEALs), GMV-T/GMV-SD/GMV-ST - AFSOC variants, and the GMV-M (Marine Corps MARSOC) variant.
IMETS (mounted on an HMMWV; not a Type Classified HMMWV)
ZEUS-HLONS (mounted on an HMMWV; not a Type Classified HMMWV)
Scorpion – Single unit version, fitted with 2B9 Vasilek 82 mm automatic mortar. This is a heavy chassis HMMWV developed in 2004 by engineers at the U.S. Army's Picatinny Arsenal. The mortar itself can fire on single shots or automatic using 4 round clips. The range for direct fire is 1,000m and the indirect fire is 4,000m. It is also intended to provide another means of destroying roadside bombs but at a safer standoff range. Only one has been produced.

M1113 Expanded Capacity Vehicle (ECV)
Under contract to the US Army, AM General developed the M1113 Expanded Capacity Vehicle (ECV). The M1097A2 is the basis for the Expanded Capacity Vehicle (ECV). The ECV provided the payload capacity allowing for larger and heavier communications shelters, improved armor protection level for scouts, military police, security police, and explosive ordnance disposal platforms.

In late 1995, the production of the M1114 based on the improved ECV chassis began. The M1114 meets Army requirements for a scout, military police, and explosive ordnance disposal vehicle with improved ballistic protection levels. The M1114 provides protection against 7.62 mm armor-piercing projectiles, 155 mm artillery air bursts and  anti-tank mine blasts.

In June 1996, the U.S. Army purchased an initial 390 M1114s for operations in Bosnia. The U.S. Air Force has several M1114 vehicles that differ in detail from the U.S. Army model. Under the designation M1116, the type was specifically designed and tailored to the needs of the U.S. Air Force. The M1116 features an expanded cargo area, armored housing for the turret gunner, and increased interior heating and air conditioning system. The M1114 and M1116 received armor at O'Gara-Hess & Eisenhardt Armoring Company of Fairfield, Ohio.  The M1145 offers the protection of the M1114 and M1116 for Air Force Air Support Operations Squadrons (ASOS).  Designed to protect Forward Air Controllers, modifications include perimeter ballistic protection, overhead burst protection, IED protection, mine blast protection, and 'white glass' transparent armor. Before the introduction of the latest armored HMMWV variants, and between 1993 and June 2006, Armor Holdings produced more than 17,500 armored HMMWVs (more than 14,000 between 2003 and 2007), all but about 160 of the earliest models were M1114, with smaller numbers of M1116 and M1045.
These extended capacity HMMWVs can drive over an  vertical wall and carry a  payload.

M1113 Shelter Carrier - base for special operations vehicles and communications shelter carriers
M1114 Up-Armored Armament Carrier
M1115 TOW Carrier (no evidence of fielding)
M1116 U.S. Air Force Up-Armored Armament Carrier
M1121 TOW Carrier
M1145 U.S. Air Force FAC
M1151 Enhanced Armament Carrier (Up-Armored Capable)
M1152 Enhanced Troop/Cargo/Shelter Carrier (Up-Armored Capable)
M1165 Up-Armored HMMWV
M1167 Up-Armored TOW Carrier

Composite HMMWV – A prototype developed by TPI Composites of Rhode Island and AM General. The purpose of the concept vehicle is to reduce the vehicle's weight so that it may more easily carry an up armor kit. TPI's all-composite HMMWV saves approximately  when compared to a current steel and aluminum HMMWV.
A prototype XM1124 Hybrid-Electric Humvee on an M1113 Humvee chassis powered by a diesel-series hybrid featuring an all-electric drive train has been developed by RDECOM/TARDEC. The vehicle has a  full-electric range for silent operations. It may have less emissions, save fuel in the battlefield, and can increase the survival rate in emergencies such as if one of the engines is destroyed or fails.
NXT 360 Humvee - This variant is available as an independent vehicle or upgrades for the M1100 Humvee series since June 2018.

International versions

 Bulgaria – Bulgarian HMMWVs have been fitted with PKS general-purpose machine guns. Bulgaria usually replaces Western machine guns on its vehicles to simplify maintenance, since the country is an active producer of Russian weapons.
 China - EQ2050/SQF2040 – See also Humvee clone manufacturing in China. Early generations of the vehicle are license-built Hummer H1, while later generations of the vehicles are of indigenous design. The licensed-built version rely on imported U.S.-made parts, including the chassis, gearbox, and diesel engine, while it gradually increase the percentage of indigenous-made content on the vehicles recently since China's People's Liberation Army is unlikely to accept any equipment that relies largely on foreign-made parts.
 Egypt – AOI equips HMMWVs with anti-armor weaponry, including TOW, Milan, or HOT missiles.
 Georgia – Georgian HMMWVs have been fitted with PK general-purpose machine guns.
 Greece – Greek HMMWVs, built entirely by ELVO in Greece, are equipped to fire the Russian 9M133 Kornet ATGM. They have a storage room for 10 missiles. Another version, the M1115GR, is equipped with the HK GMG 40. Israel's Plasan has developed armored versions of the HMMWV, assembled by ELVO in Greece as the M1114GR, M1115GR and M1118GR. ELVO also produced the Ambulance version, a SOF version, and an engineering version of the HMMWV for the Hellenic Army.
 Israel – Plasan has also designed and supplied an HMMWV armored protection kit for the Portuguese Army, and a different version assembled by Automotive Industries in Nazareth for the Israel Defense Forces.
 Mexico – The Dirección General de Industria Militar (DGIM), the Mexican Army's prime wholly owned military manufacturer, builds the HMMWV under license in Mexico after a small number of American-built Humvees proved to be reliable within the Mexican army. Mexican HMMWVs are similar to the American built models but are slightly longer.  They feature a standard selective shift automatic transmission connected to a Mercedes Benz diesel engine and an anti-spalling layer in the passenger cabin. Many are equipped with bulletproof windows and a layer of armor unique to these Mexican HMMWVs. In 2010, Mexico displayed a wagon variant with a second gun hatch to cover the rear of the vehicle. This version also featured a more powerful V-12 engine and civilian road wheels to increase top speed capabilities in urban areas.
 Poland – Polish Land Forces operate 222 HMMWVs (5 unknown variants are operated by Polish Special Forces). Over 200 are used by the 18th Airborne Battalion which is a part of the 6th Airborne Brigade. The used variants are designated as follows: Tumak-2 – M1043A2, Tumak-3 – M1025A2, Tumak-4 – M1097A2, Tumak-5 – M1045A2, Tumak-6 – M1097A2 (variant used for transport of special containers), Tumak-7 – M1035A2. All vehicles are modified to meet Polish road regulations and are equipped with Polish communication devices. 140 HMMWVs are equipped with a Fonet digital internal communication device. 120 Tumak-2s and Tumak-3s have a rotatable mount which can be fitted with either the UKM-2000P 7.62  mm general-purpose machine gun or the NSW-B 12.7 mm heavy machine gun. Tumak-5s are used by anti-tank subunits and are armed with a dismountable Spike missile. Additionally Polish forces of ISAF operate 120 HMMWVs on loan from the U.S. forces.
 Switzerland – Early MOWAG Eagle light armored vehicles utilized the HMMWV chassis, although the latest uses a Duro III chassis. The Eagle is an NBC-tight, air-conditioned, and armor-protected vehicle. It is in service and available in several configurations with varying levels of armor protection. The Eagle can be fitted with a wide assortment of armaments.
 Turkey – Otokar Cobra – is a wheeled armoured vehicle developed by Turkish firm Otokar which uses some mechanical components, sub-systems and some parts of the HMMWV.

Survivable Combat Tactical Vehicle

Textron's Survivable Combat Tactical Vehicle (SCTV) is a protective capsule that can increase Humvee survivability to MRAP levels while significantly improving mobility; the modifications come in five kits, but all five need to be installed before the vehicle can be properly called an SCTV. The vehicle features a monocoque V-shaped hull and angled sides to help deflect rocket-propelled grenades (RPGs) with scalable levels of protection. It has greater engine power, replacing the 6.5-liter diesel engine with a Cummins 6.7-liter diesel and Allison 6-speed transmission, as well as a stronger suspension, improved brakes, higher ground clearance, and new onboard instrumentation. Also included are a powerful air conditioner and heating system, run-flat tires, a thermal guard liner under the roof, sharp edges removed from inside the cabin, blast attenuating seats, and a folding gunner's turret allowing rapid deployment from a cargo aircraft or shipboard below deck. Although heavier than the Humvee, the SCTV is half the weight and costs $150,000 less than a comparably survivable MRAP. The basic version is a four-passenger armament carrier, but it can be configured as a nine-passenger troop carrier, air-defense vehicle, flatbed cargo truck, or field ambulance depending on the type of Humvee it is converted from.

Work began on the SCTV in 2008 in anticipation of U.S. military upgrades, but it was shelved once they made the JLTV a priority.  Textron then focused on selling the SCTV upgrade package to up to 25 countries operating the global fleet, a potential market of up to 10,000 vehicles.  The upgrade can enhance the survivability of previously soft-skinned versions, sometimes sold by the U.S. as Excess Defense Articles, while costing and weighing less than a comparable MRAP.  By 2015, Colombia had installed the SCTV into three Humvees for testing, and Ukraine had shown interest in upgrading their old-model Humvees recently supplied by the U.S. Ukraine ordered three SCTVs in February 2016.

Operators

  – An unknown number, estimated in the hundreds, were captured by the Taliban in their 2021 offensive, and have been in use by the new government's Islamic Emirate Army.
  – 248 on order, gifted by US.
  – +100 for the Algerian Special Forces and the Parachute Commando Regiments M1097A2/M1116/M1097A2/HISAR/K-TaCS.
  - 400+ in the Argentine Armed Forces.
  – 100+ HMMWV use by Azerbaijani army and peacekeeping force.
  – 10 HMMWV use by Armenian peacekeeping force.
  – Vehicles sold under the U.S. Foreign Military Sales program.
 
  – 25 in 2010 and 44 donated by the U.S. in 2017. 30 in 2021, 99 in total. More donated this and the past year.
  – 52 vehicles, 50 are the up-armored M1114 variant, and two are ambulances.
  – Small numbers (M1113 and M1117) in use by Joint Task Force 2 (JTF-2) and Special Operations Regiment (CSOR). Used in Afghanistan.
  – Vehicles sold under the U.S. Foreign Military Sales program.
  565 in the Chilean Army and 100 in Chilean Marine Corps.
 
  - 112 vehicles. 
  – Mainly used by the 601st Special Forces Group.
  - 102 vehicles.
  – 30 vehicles.
  – Vehicles sold under the U.S. Foreign Military Sales program. They have seen combat in the 1990s during the FRUD rebellion.
 
 
 
  - 681 vehicles ≈276 built in Greece by ELVO with designations M1114GR to M1119GR.
  – Vehicles procured via the U.S. Foreign Military Sales program.
  -  Acquired from Afghanistan in August 2021 from ANA soldiers fleeing from the Taliban takeover.
  – During the Iraq War, stockpiled U.S. military HMMWVs were given to the Iraqi Army, Iraqi Security Forces.  The Iraqi military has more than 10,000+ Humvees. Some of these have been captured by the Islamic State in 2014. Most of them were recaptured by the Iraq Armed Forces as well as other regional actors after IS defeat in 2017. While the remainder were lost through combat.
 
 
  – Several vehicles in use by security forces.
  – 200+ vehicles
  – Vehicles sold via the U.S. Foreign Military Sales program.
 
  – 1,300+ vehicles
  Libya – 200 donated by the U.S. Army in July 2013.
  – 200 vehicles
  – 10 to 90, modified at Eurokompozit, armed with PK 7.62 x 54R heavy MG
  – Morocco has 4000+ vehicles in the Royal Moroccan Army, some of them are fitted with BGM-71 TOW ATGM.
  – 90 vehicles
  – Vehicles sold via the U.S. Foreign Military Sales program. 3,000 vehicles in service.
 
  – Borrowed U.S. vehicles in Afghanistan were modified by New Zealand Special Air Service and replaced by Pinzgauer. The Army used a small number of U.S. either free/leased vehicles in Afghanistan until 2013.
  Oman – Vehicles sold via the U.S. Foreign Military Sales program.
  - 30+ donaded for Taiwan in 2016.
  – 34 vehicles (12 M-1151A1 deployed in Haiti as part of the UN peacekeeping contingent, 22 M-1165A1 Special Ops operated by the 19th Commando Battalion). There is possibly an upcoming purchase of 100 additional vehicles.
  – 300+ vehicles
 
 – 47 vehicles used by Portuguese Army and 3 by the Portuguese Air Force.
  – 322 of M1113/M1114/M1165/M1151 variants
  – Limited number of USMC vehicles which were stationed at Georgian port of Poti and were waiting to be shipped to US, were captured by Russian troops. One other vehicle was captured from the Ukrainian 95th Air Assault Brigade in 2015 during War in Donbas. The said vehicle after being operated for several years by the so-called People's Militia of the LPR was seen in late February 2022 in Rostov Oblast in Russia in the course of the Russo-Ukrainian crisis.
  – Vehicles were sold to Saudi Arabia by the U.S. under the Foreign Military Sales program.
  – 23 vehicles donated by the U.S. seen in action as recently as 2017.
  – 123 vehicles, used only by the Infantería de Marina. The Spanish Army, the Spanish Air Force and the Spanish National Police use the URO VAMTAC, a similar vehicle, produced in Spain.
  – 40 vehicles, 17 unarmored and 4 armored vehicles, donated to the Serbian Armed Forces by the US government in 2013, 19 more donated in 2017.
  – Slovak Armed Forces used 6 vehicles in Iraq.
  – Slovenian Armed Forces use as patrol vehicle.
  – Vehicles sold by the U.S. under the Foreign Military Sales program.
  – One example obtained for evaluation by army in 1989.
  Syria – Captured from ISIS
 Syrian National Army
Hamza Division
  – Vehicles sold via the U.S. Foreign Military Sales program. 9,000+ vehicles.
   - An unknown number of M1152A1 HMMWV "Gun trucks" were obtained by the Tajik Border Guards from fleeing ANA soldiers after the Taliban reestablished itself. 
  – sold by the U.S. under the Foreign Military Sales program.
 : Royal Thai Army (M998, M1038A1, M1097A1, M1037, M1042, M1025, M1026A1, M966, M997, M997A2)
  – 52 vehicles donated by the U.S. in May 2015 and some sold via the U.S. Foreign Military Sales program.
  – 342 vehicles (since 2001) of М1097А2/М1114/М998/M1152/М1116/M1025/HMMWV variants. Out of all vehicles around 110 are at the 95th Airmobile Brigade, 10 vehicles were donated to the Polish–Ukrainian Peace Force Battalion (POLUKRBAT). Reports say that after the Battle of Debaltseve insurgents were seen driving around in 'Humvee-like' vehicle. "Hundreds" of vehicles were pledged to be donated to Ukraine due to the Russian invasion in 2022. Over 200 vehicles were sent to Ukraine in October 2022. 138 more to be delivered by the United States in 2023.
  – 230,000 (US Army and US Marine Corps) Some used by various law enforcement agencies purchased through civilian sales.
 
 
  – M1123 and M1151 variants

Former user
: The former Islamic Republic of Afghanistan ordered 3,334 more in 2010 and 2011 for its National Police, National Army and other military. 950 M1114 vehicles delivered to the army by November 2012. Others were taken by surviving Afghan troops who joined up with the National Resistance Front.

Non-State Actors

  Islamic State – 2,300 (captured)
  Kataib Hezbollah
 Syrian Democratic Forces: Equipped with at least 20 Humvees from 2017 with further details not revealed.
  People's Defense Units
 Taliban: An unknown number, estimated in the hundreds, were captured by the Taliban from the Afghan National Army.

Civilian sales
In December 2014, the Department of Defense began auctioning off some 4,000 used Humvees to the public.  While some have been transferred to domestic law enforcement agencies, this is the first time the military vehicles have been made available for civilian ownership. The idea is to sell them with starting bids at $10,000 each, rather than simply scrapping them as a way to save money and repurpose them.  M998, M998A1, M1038, and M1038A1 model Humvees are available, which are out of U.S. service and lack armor.  AM General has been opposed to the resale of military Humvees to the general public, primarily because surplus government vehicles would have cut into sales related to the civilian Hummer model, whose production ended in 2010. The first sales from auction occurred on 17 December 2014 for 25 of the Humvees. Bids ranged from $21,500 for a 1989 M1038 to $41,000 for a 1994 AM General M998A1. The average bid was around $30,000 and the sale of the 25 vehicles netted $744,000 total. GovPlanet has since taken over the contract and sells Humvees at its weekly online auctions.

HUMVEE C-Series
In 2017, it was announced that AM General signed a contract with VLF Automotive to build a new civilian version of the HMMWV for sale outside of the US. The initial contract calls for up to 100 a year to be built and sold overseas to places such as China, Europe, Middle East, and Australia.  These are essentially updated Hummer H1s, but cannot use the Hummer-brand owned by General Motors. These vehicles have not been approved for sale in the US due to safety or emission standards.

Replicas

Kits have been produced for the general market to turn a sedan into a Humvee lookalike. An alternative is to buy a preconstructed (or "turnkey") model. Various kits exist, but one of the more well known is the Volkswagen Beetle-based "Wombat". This was previously named "HummBug", until the threat of a lawsuit from General Motors forced changes to the name and the grille design to make it look less like the real thing. It can be purchased/built for about US$18,000; this puts it considerably cheaper than the actual HMMWV ($56,000), or Hummer.

In Australia, a Gold Coast-based company called Rhino Buggies produces replicas of the Hummer H1 based on the Nissan Patrol 4WD vehicle for around A$30,000.

In the U.S., four companies offered Hummer-look-alike body kits that can be mated to GM full-size trucks and Suburban chassis and, in some cases, Ford, Dodge, and even Cadillac applications. Some models are; Urban Gorilla from Urban Manufacturing, Endeavor SB400 and SB4x400 from Forever Off-Road, the Jurassic Truck Corporation T-Rex, and the Bummer from Tatonka Products An additional company offers plans so for chassis building. The kits range from two-door fiberglass models to steel tube and sheet metal constructions.

Similar vehicles
 Agrale Marruá – Brazil
 BJ2022 – Chinese military vehicle, currently in service
 Dongfeng EQ2050 – Chinese military vehicle
 FMC XR311 – an early prototype, as the successor to the M151 jeep, that led to the HMMWV
 Mohafiz ASV - HIT made Armoured security vehicle of Pakistani origin.
 GAZ Tigr – Russian military vehicle, currently in service
 Hawkei – Australian military vehicle
 Iveco LMV – Italian military vehicle
 Komatsu LAV – Japanese military vehicle
 Lamborghini Cheetah, an Italian prototype contender for the original HMMWV contract. Forerunner of the "Rambo Lambo" Lamborghini LM002.
 TATA LSV (Light Specialist Vehicle) – a new vehicle by Tata Motors of India.
 Mahindra Marksman, Mahindra Rakshak and Mahindra Armored Light Specialist Vehicle – vehicles manufactured by Mahindra in India for operating in similar roles like the HUMVEE.
 Kia KLTV - South Korean light tactical vehicle
 Marine Multi-purpose Vehicle (MMPV) – Philippines
 MOWAG Eagle – Swiss military vehicle
 Otokar Cobra – Turkish light armored vehicle with HMMWV parts
 Oshkosh L-ATV – U.S. military vehicle
 Pindad Maung – Indonesian military vehicle
 Predator SOV
 SPECTRE light vehicle – U.S. light air-portable utility/special forces-type vehicle proposed as a possible HMMWV replacement.
 T-98 Kombat – Russian civilian SUV
 AMZ Tur – Polish military vehicle
 Tiuna – Venezuelan military vehicle
 Toyota Mega Cruiser – Japanese military vehicle in service with the Japan Self Defense Forces. AKA "Koukidousha" or "".
 URO VAMTAC – Spanish four-wheel tactical military vehicle by UROVESA
 VECTOR - Dutch tactical military vehicle
 VLEGA Gaucho – Argentinian-Brazilian military vehicle
 Weststar GK-M1 – Malaysian military light vehicle
 Kozak – Ukrainian military vehicle

See also
List of "M" series military vehicles.
 Hummer H1, H2, and H3. The H1 is a civilian derivative of the HMMWV, while the H2 and H3 are based on regular GM truck chassis and styled after it.
Interim Fast Attack Vehicle
Interceptor ASV
Sandstorm, an HMMWV modified into an autonomous vehicle.

Notes

Bibliography

External links

 Army fact file
 AM General HMMWV page
 HMMWV Manuals
 HUMVEE C-Series brochure 

1980s cars
All-wheel-drive vehicles
Military vehicles of the United States
Military trucks of the United States
Off-road vehicles
Military vehicles introduced in the 1980s
Plug-in hybrid vehicles
Diesel-electric cars
Military light utility vehicles
Hummer